Orovnica is a village and municipality in the Žarnovica District, Banská Bystrica Region in Slovakia.

Etymology
The name comes from the Slovak orovnať—to level (ground). Orovnica—leveled ground.  1209 Varanza, 1525 Orownycza.

References

External links
https://web.archive.org/web/20071116010355/http://www.statistics.sk/mosmis/eng/run.html

Villages and municipalities in Žarnovica District